Claudia Rivero is a reporter currently based in Philadelphia, Pennsylvania. Her recent work includes the short documentary Where is Janteyl, the story of a pregnant teen who disappeared under suspicious circumstances in Delaware. She is also involved as a producer for The Messages Project, an award-winning nonprofit dedicated to helping children of incarcerated parents.

Claudia spent fours years as a general assignment reporter at NBC10 in Philadelphia. Prior to NBC10 Claudia spent eight years at KTVK in Phoenix, Arizona, where she interviewed killer Jodi Arias shortly after her arrest. The interview also aired on CNN and Nancy Grace on HLN. Claudia filled in on the anchor desk for Good Morning Arizona weekend edition, Good Day Arizona and MAS Arizona, KTVK's former Spanish-language cable station. She received two Emmy awards and two Associated Press awards during her time at KTVK.

Claudia started her career at Univision's KTVW-33 in Phoenix, Arizona. She received a B.A. in journalism and mass communication from Arizona State University.

Claudia volunteers at Books Through Bars in West Philadelphia, a nonprofit that sends free books and educational materials to prisoners.

External links 
"ClaudiaRivero10", Claudia Rivero "Twitter", March 8, 2016
6 Years Later, "www.whereisjanteyl.com", February 3, 2016
"New NBC10 reporter Claudia Rivero is a surprise metalhead", philly.com, May 4, 2009
GPHCC Honors Panama 'Gateway to the World", "newsworks.org", February 8, 2013

American television journalists
American women television journalists
Television personalities from Phoenix, Arizona
Television personalities from Philadelphia
Journalists from Pennsylvania